Route 899 may refer to:

Canada
Alberta Highway 899

Israel
Route 899 (Israel)

United States